False hellebore is used as the common name of plants in two different families: 

 Adonis vernalis (Ranunculaceae)
 Veratrum species (Melanthiaceae)

See also
 Hellebore